Paolo Barison (23 June 1936 in – 17 April 1979) was an Italian association footballer who played as a striker.

Club career
During his club career, Barison played for S.S.C. Venezia, Genoa C.F.C., A.C. Milan, U.C. Sampdoria, A.S. Roma, and S.S.C. Napoli. He was a key figure in Milan winning the 1962–63 European Cup, scoring six goals during their cup run, however he was dropped for the final in favour of Gino Pivatelli.

International career
At international level, Barison earned 9 caps and scored 6 goals for the Italy national football team, and played in the 1966 FIFA World Cup.

References

External links

1936 births
1979 deaths
People from Vittorio Veneto
Italian footballers
Italian expatriate footballers
Italy international footballers
1966 FIFA World Cup players
Venezia F.C. players
Genoa C.F.C. players
A.C. Milan players
U.C. Sampdoria players
A.S. Roma players
S.S.C. Napoli players
A.C. Bellaria Igea Marina players
Toronto Blizzard (1971–1984) players
Italian football managers
A.C. Milan managers
Serie A players
Serie C players
North American Soccer League (1968–1984) players
Expatriate soccer players in Canada
Italian expatriate sportspeople in Canada
Association football forwards
Footballers from Veneto
Sportspeople from the Province of Treviso